Bagni is a surname. Notable people with the surname include: 

 Adam Bagni (born 1984), American journalist and sportscaster
 Giovanni Francesco Guidi di Bagno (1578-1641), Italian cardinal
 Gwen Bagni (1913–2001), American screenwriter and TV writer
 John Bagni (1910–1954), American actor and writer
 Leonard Bagni (1593–1650), Istrian priest, theologian, philosopher and professor
 Margherita Bagni (1902–1960), Italian actress and voice actress
 Ray Bagni (born 1970), American wrestler and promoter, known as Chubby Dudley
 Salvatore Bagni (born 1956), Italian footballer